Dakowy may refer to the following places in Poland:

Dakowy Mokre
Dakowy Suche